WMEN (640 AM, "Fox Sports 640") is a sports radio station licensed to Royal Palm Beach, Florida, United States. The station primarily serves the West Palm Beach, Florida market and provides strong coverage of nearby Fort Lauderdale and Miami. Fox Sports 640 is a Fox Sports Radio affiliate, carrying hourly sports updates along with weekend and overnight programming. The station is owned by Hubbard Broadcasting, with studios in West Palm Beach. Under a Special Temporary Authority from the FCC, WMEN broadcasts at 25,000 watts daytime power and 4,500 watts nighttime power in order to overcome Cuban interference.

Local programming
None. Joe Raineri & Steve Zemach, who were hosting from 6am-9am ET, exited on March 13, 2017.

History
WMEN was initially religious brokered station WLVJ before swapping call signs, format, and dial positions with adult standards WJNA 1230 AM in 2003. As 'Unforgettable' WJNA the station was home to prominent South Florida radio personalities including Chuck Zink, Greg Budell, Ron Hersey and Joyce Kaufman.

WJNA dropped the adult standards format on October 23, 2006, becoming ManTalk 640 WMEN with syndicated talk programming appealing to males age 25–54. WMEN debuted as 640 Sports on March 3, 2008, retaining the WMEN call letters. Previous network affiliations include NBC Sports, CBS Sports, Yahoo! Sports Radio, and Sporting News Radio.

WMEN, along with co-owned stations KBXD, WFLL, and WFTL, was purchased out of bankruptcy from James Crystal Enterprises by Mark Jorgenson's ACM JCE IV B LLC in a transaction that was consummated on August 6, 2015, at a purchase price of $5.5 million.

Effective April 27, 2017, Alpha Media purchased WMEN and WFTL for $2 million.

On July 3, 2017, WMEN rebranded as "640 The Hurricane".

On September 27, 2018, Alpha Media agreed to sell their cluster at West Palm Beach to Hubbard Radio. The sale, at a price of $88 million, was consummated on January 23, 2019.

On August 30, 2019, WMEN rebranded as "Fox Sports 640".

Previous logo

References

External links
WMEN official website

MEN
Sports radio stations in the United States
Radio stations established in 1988
1988 establishments in Florida
Fox Sports Radio stations
Hubbard Broadcasting